Manuchehrabad (also Romanized as Manūchehrābād) is a village in Dorudfaraman Rural District, in the Central District of Kermanshah County, Kermanshah Province, Iran. At the 2006 census, its population was 618, in 137 families.

References 

Populated places in Kermanshah County